There are at least 45 named oil fields in Montana according to the U.S. Geological Survey, Board of Geographic Names. The USGS defines oil field as: "Area where petroleum is or was removed from the Earth."

An oil field is a region with an abundance of oil wells extracting petroleum (crude oil) from below ground. Because the oil reservoirs typically extend over a large area, possibly several hundred kilometres across, full exploitation entails multiple wells scattered across the area. In addition, there may be exploratory wells probing the edges, pipelines to transport the oil elsewhere, and support facilities.

The Schlumberger Oilfield Glossary defines oil field as: "An accumulation, pool or group of pools of oil in the subsurface. An oil field consists of a reservoir in a shape that will trap hydrocarbons and that is covered by an impermeable or sealing rock. Typically, industry professionals use the term with an implied assumption of economic size."

 Arch Apex Gas Field,  Toole County, Montana, el.  
 Bascom Oil Field,  Rosebud County, Montana, el.  
 Bears Den Oil and Gas Field,  Liberty County, Montana, el.  
 Belle Creek Oil Field,  Powder River County, Montana, el.  
 Big Wall Oil Field,  Musselshell County, Montana, el.  
 Bowes Oil Field,  Blaine County, Montana, el.  
 Brorson Oil Field,  Richland County, Montana, el.  
 Cabin Creek Oil Field,  Fallon County, Montana, el.  
 Cupton Oil Field,  Fallon County, Montana, el.  
 Devon Gas Field,  Toole County, Montana, el.  
 East Poplar Oil Field,  Roosevelt County, Montana, el.  
 Elk Basin Oil Field,  Carbon County, Montana, el.  
 Flat Coulee Oil and Gas Field,  Liberty County, Montana, el.  
 Flat Lake Oil Field,  Sheridan County, Montana, el.  
 Fred and George Creek Oil and Gas Field,  Toole County, Montana, el.  
 Gas City Oil Field,  Dawson County, Montana, el.  
 Glendive Oil Field,  Dawson County, Montana, el.  
 Grandview Oil and Gas Field,  Liberty County, Montana, el.  
 Ivanhoe Dome Oil Field,  Musselshell County, Montana, el.  
 Keg Coulee Oil Field,  Musselshell County, Montana, el.  
 Keith Gas Field,  Liberty County, Montana, el.  
 Kevin Sunburst Oil Field,  Toole County, Montana, el.  
 Little Beaver East Oil Field,  Bowman County, Montana, el.  
 Little Beaver Oil Field,  Fallon County, Montana, el.  
 Melstone Oil Field,  Musselshell County, Montana, el.  
 Monarch Oil Field,  Fallon County, Montana, el.  
 Mosby Dome Cat Creek Oil Field,  Petroleum County, Montana, el.  
 Mosser Dome Oil Field,  Yellowstone County, Montana, el.  
 North Pine Oil Field,  Dawson County, Montana, el.  
 Northwest Sumatra Oil Field,  Rosebud County, Montana, el.  
 Oil Hills,  Park County, Montana, el.  
 Pennel Oil Field,  Fallon County, Montana, el.  
 Prairie Dell Oil and Gas Field,  Toole County, Montana, el.  
 Ragged Point Oil Field,  Musselshell County, Montana, el.  
 Rattlesnake Butte Oil Field,  Petroleum County, Montana, el.  
 Reagan Camp Oil Field,  Glacier County, Montana, el.  
 S W Kevin Gas Field,  Toole County, Montana, el.  
 Soap Creek Oilfield,  Big Horn County, Montana, el.  
 South Pine Oil Field,  Wibaux County, Montana, el.  
 South Wills Creek Oil Field,  Fallon County, Montana, el.  
 Stensvad Oil Field,  Rosebud County, Montana, el.  
 Tiger Ridge Gas Field,  Hill County, Montana, el.  
 Utopia Gas and Oil Field,  Liberty County, Montana, el.  
 West Dome Cat Creek Oil Field,  Petroleum County, Montana, el.  
 Whitlash Gas and Oil Field,  Liberty County, Montana, el.

See also
 Bakken formation

Notes

Montana
Oil fields